The 2018 Liga 3 Finals was the two-legged final that decided the winner of the 2018 Liga 3, the fourth season of third-tier competition in Indonesia organised by PSSI, and the second season since it was renamed from the Liga Nusantara to the Liga 3.

The finals was contested in two-legged home-and-away format between Persik and PSCS. The first leg was hosted by Persik at Brawijaya Stadium in Kediri on 27 December 2018, while the second leg was hosted by PSCS at Wijayakusuma Stadium in Cilacap on 30 December 2018.

Persik defeated PSCS 3–2 on aggregate to win their first Liga 3 title.

Road to the final

Note: In all scores below, the score of the related team is given first.

Format
The finals was played on a home-and-away two-legged basis. If tied on aggregate, the away goals rule would be used. If still tied on away goals rule, 30 minutes of extra time would be played. If still tied after extra time, the penalty shoot-out would be used to determine the winner.

Matches

First leg

Second leg

References

Liga 3 Finals
Liga 3 Finals
Liga 3 Finals